Sedzo is a community in Kwilu province, Democratic Republic of the Congo (DRC).

References
http://www.places-in-the-world.com/8444223-cd-place-sedzo.html

Populated places in Kwilu Province